Lisa Montgomery may refer to:

Lisa Kennedy Montgomery (born 1972), American political satirist known as Kennedy
Lisa M. Montgomery (1968–2021), killer of Bobbie Jo Stinnett, executed by lethal injection